Syed Aqeel Hassan born 4 August 1988 is a Pakistani professional international Kabaddi player. He was member of the Pakistan national kabaddi team that won Asian bronze medals in 2014 Asian Games in Incheon.

References

Pakistani kabaddi players
Living people
1988 births
Asian Games medalists in kabaddi
Kabaddi players at the 2014 Asian Games
Asian Games bronze medalists for Pakistan
Medalists at the 2014 Asian Games